"Mulder and Scully" is a song by Welsh alternative rock band Catatonia, released as a single from their 1998 album, International Velvet. The song makes direct reference to fictional FBI special agents Fox Mulder (David Duchovny) and Dana Scully (Gillian Anderson), the two main characters of the popular sci-fi TV series The X-Files who work on cases linked to the paranormal, called X-Files. In an interview Cerys Matthews, co-writer of the song, explained that while she was not a serious fan of the show, the basic premise of the series matched the concept of what she was trying to express.

"Mulder and Scully" was released as the second single from International Velvet on 19 January 1998. Originally, it was supposed to be the first single but was delayed due to circumstances beyond the band's control. The song was Catatonia's first single in the United States. "Mulder and Scully" became the group's break-out hit and received a mixed to positive response from the music press; many critics felt that, musically, the song was well played, but that the track's pop culture references were out of place.

The song reached number three on the UK Singles Chart, making it Catatonia's highest-charting UK song. It also became a hit in Iceland, reaching number two, and in Ireland, where it peaked at number 17. A music video was released that featured the band performing the track while Mulder and Scully, played by look-alikes, search the concert venue with torches.

Lyrics and composition
The song makes direct reference to FBI special agents Fox Mulder (David Duchovny) and Dana Scully (Gillian Anderson), the two main characters of the popular sci-fi TV series The X-Files who work on cases linked to the paranormal, called X-Files. Although the title and refrain reference the popular show, the song has little to do with the two characters. Instead, the reference to Mulder and Scully is a metaphor for a relationship being so "strange" that it could be "a case for Mulder and Scully", a reference to the paranormal cases—the titular X-Files—the two investigate on the show. Cerys Matthews, the co-writer of the song, explained that the conceit of the song was "about asking Mulder and Scully to figure out this thing called love. I like the idea of two people going round the planet investigating odd phenomena, in this case love".

Matthews later admitted that she was not a serious fan of the show, but that she only used the line because it adequately described the type of relationship she was singing about. In an interview with the Daily Record, she explained, "I'm not a big fan of [The X-Files] but I got the line about things getting strange for Mulder and Scully from watching the odd episode". After questioning, she later said that she would "prefer to go out for a night on the town with Gazza and Chris Evans than meet [The X-Files] stars Gillian Anderson and David Duchovny". Matthews also related that "I'm sure loads of people bought the record by mistake, but who cares? They should be flattered we wrote a song about [The X-Files] anyway".

Release and acclaim

The song was met with mixed to positive reviews from critics; many reviewers lauded the band's musical composition, but maligned the track for its heavy reliance on pop culture references.
The Sunday Mirror wrote positively of the song and called it "hard rockin'". Ben Myers from the now-defunct music magazine Melody Maker named the song the "Single of the Week" and called it "fantastic". He noted that "they've damn near written a perfect pop song. The first best single of the year". Jerry Rubino, host of the popular radio show "Left of Center", named the song one of his favorite "Brit Things". Sarah Zupko from PopMatters noted that the song was built around "somewhat silly X-Files references", but that it possessed "hooks to die for". Stephen Thomas Erlewine from AllMusic gave the song a relatively positive review and singled it out as an "AllMusic Pick". He also praised the song's "terrific [hook]" but was slightly critical of the "self-conscious pop culture references". Despite this, he noted the band was successfully able to "bring memorable melodies to the [song]". A subsequent review by AllMusic awarded the single, by itself, two-and-a-half stars out of five. NME called the song "little more than fodder for nostalgia TV", written by a "lazy television researcher's imagination".

Cerys Matthews and the band were extremely pleased with the final product, calling it a "better song" than "All Around the World" by Oasis, the single's main competitor at the time. Matthews later said that the lyrics for "Mulder and Scully" were "good, top to bottom". Catatonia later released the song as part of their 2002 greatest hits album, And the song was later included on various Britpop compilations, including the Common People: The Britpop Story album, and the 100 Hits of the 90s album, released by the BBC.

Chart performance
Originally, Catatonia wished to release "Mulder and Scully" during mid-1997. However, due to complications, these plans were scrapped and the song "I Am the Mob" was released instead. "Mulder and Scully" was eventually released on 19 January 1998, and, due to heavy promotion via BBC Radio 1, soon became the band's break-out hit, propelling them "into the limelight [...] numerous interviews and television appearances". The band's record label, Blanco y Negro Records, promoted the single with a press release that described the song as "[s]pooky but spiky" and a "clever grower of a track". The song debuted on the United Kingdom chart on 31 January 1998 and made its last appearance on 4 April 1998. During its first week of release, the single performed exceptionally well. Music stores reported that the physical release of "Mulder and Scully" was selling slightly fewer copies than Usher's single "You Make Me Wanna...". Cerys Matthews later told Melody Maker that the single out-sold Oasis "for two days". During its first week, "Mulder and Scully" peaked on the chart at number three and spent a total of 10 weeks on the chart. The song also charted on the Irish Singles Chart, entering the charts on 2 May 1998. It peaked at number 17 and spent five weeks charting. Later, a Japanese EP was released under the name "Mulder and Scully EP". It combined tracks from the title single, as well as the "I Am the Mob" and "Road Rage" singles.

Music video

The music video for "Mulder and Scully" was directed by Gerald McMorrow and features the band performing at a venue intercut with scenes of life on a tour bus at night. All the while, Mulder and Scully—played by look-alikes—investigate the area around the concert with torches. Eventually, the agents begin passionately kissing while Catatonia plays their song on a stage. The video was filmed at T.J.'s, a rock concert venue in Newport, Wales. A call was made for fans of the band to arrive and play the part of the audience. While actor Rhys Ifans, one year before his breakout performance in Notting Hill, features prominently. The entire video shoot took a full day to film. The video for "Mulder and Scully" was extremely popular; according to Billboard magazine, the video for "Mulder and Scully" received "heavy rotation" and was played "30 to 35" times weekly in the United Kingdom. The video was heavily promoted in the United States, due in part to its direct allusion to The X-Files, and it received decent airplay.

Track listings
UK CD single
"Mulder and Scully" – 4:10
"No Stone Unturned" – 3:28
"Mantra for the Lost" – 2:47
"Mulder and Scully" (The Ex-Files mix) – 4:53

Japanese EP
"Mulder and Scully" (album version) – 4:10
"Road Rage" (radio edit) – 5:10
"Jump or Be Sane" – 4:00
"No Stone Unturned" – 3:28
"Mantra for the Lost" – 2:47
"I'm Cured" – 2:55
"Blow the Millennium Pt.2" – 2:30
"I Am the Mob" (Luca Brasi mix) – 3:41
"Mulder and Scully" (The Ex-Files mix) – 4:53
"Road Rage (Ghia)" – 5:10

Personnel
Cerys Matthews – Vocals 
Mark Roberts – Guitar 
Paul Jones – Bass 
Owen Powell – Guitar 
Aled Richards – Drums

Charts

Weekly charts

Year-end charts

Certifications

See also
 The X-Files franchise
 Music of The X-Files

References

External links
Official Music Video on MTV.com

1997 songs
1998 singles
Blanco y Negro Records singles
Catatonia (band) songs
Songs written by Cerys Matthews
Songs written by Mark Roberts (singer)
The X-Files music